WLAA (1600 AM) is a radio station broadcasting a Regional Mexican format. Licensed to Winter Garden, Florida, United States, it serves the Orlando area. The station is currently owned by Shanti Persaud, through licensee Unity Broadcasting LLC.

History

WLAA was first licensed, as WGOA, in 1957, to E. V. Price in Winter Garden, for 1,000 watts daytime-only on 1600 kHz. The call letters were changed to WOKB on May 25, 1959, to WXXO on April 4, 1988, to WXTO on January 22, 1990, and back to WOKB on January 31, 1994.

Expanded Band assignment

On March 17, 1997, the Federal Communications Commission (FCC) announced that eighty-eight stations had been given permission to move to newly available "Expanded Band" transmitting frequencies, ranging from 1610 to 1700 kHz, with WOKB authorized to move from 1600 to 1680 kHz.

A Construction Permit for the expanded band station was assigned the call letters WTIR (now WOKB) on April 12, 1999.  The FCC's initial policy was that both the original station and its expanded band counterpart could operate simultaneously for up to five years, after which owners would have to turn in one of the two licenses, depending on whether they preferred the new assignment or elected to remain on the original frequency. However, this deadline has been extended multiple times, and both stations have remained authorized. One restriction is that the FCC has generally required paired original and expanded band stations to remain under common ownership.

Later history

On May 6, 2008, the two stations on 1600 and 1680 AM swapped call letters, with WOKB transferred to the expanded band station on 1680 AM, and WLAA moved to 1600 AM. 1600 AM's call letters later changed to WNTF on November 13, 2017, and back to WLAA on June 1, 2018.

As of 2018, the Regional Mexican "La Nueva Que Buena" format has moved to WKIQ 1240 AM.

References

External links

 FCC History Cards for WLAA (covering 1956-1979 as WGOA / WOKB)

Mexican-American culture in Florida
LAA
Regional Mexican radio stations in the United States
LAA